The 2017 StuSells Toronto Tankard was held from October 11 to 14 at the High Park Club in Toronto, Ontario. The event was held as part of the 2017–18 World Curling Tour.

Men

Teams
The teams are listed as follows:

A event

B event

C event

Playoffs

Women

Teams 

The teams are listed as follows:

Round Robin Standings

Playoffs

References

External links

2017 in Canadian curling
Curling in Toronto
2017 in Toronto
October 2017 sports events in Canada